Diemelsee may refer to the follow places in Germany:

 Diemelsee, a reservoir on the border of Hesse and North Rhine-Westphalia 
Diemelsee (municipality), a municipality in Northwest Hesse 
 Diemelsee Nature Park in Hesse and North Rhine-Westphalia